The Flanagin Law Office is a historic office building at 320 Clay Street in Arkadelphia, Arkansas. The front brick portion of the building was built in 1858 for J. L. Witherspoon, a local attorney, who later became Attorney General of Arkansas and sat on the state's high court. Witherspoon took on Harris Flanagin as a partner; Flanagin served as Governor of Arkansas during the American Civil War, and used this building as a law office for many years. Flanagin's son had the wood-frame rear section added, converting the building into a residence. It has since been converted back to a law office.

The building was listed on the National Register of Historic Places in 1977.

See also

 National Register of Historic Places listings in Clark County, Arkansas

References

External links

 Flanagin Law Office at Encyclopedia of Arkansas

1858 establishments in Arkansas
Commercial buildings completed in 1858
Buildings and structures in Arkadelphia, Arkansas
National Register of Historic Places in Clark County, Arkansas
Office buildings on the National Register of Historic Places in Arkansas
Law offices
Legal history of Arkansas